Amar Musić (born 21 March 1987) is a Croatian male weightlifter, competing in the 85 kg category and representing Croatia at international competitions. He participated in the men's 85 kg event  at the 2015 World Weightlifting Championships, and at the 2016 Summer Olympics, finishing in fifteenth position.

In July 2012, the Croatian Institute for Toxicology and Antidoping gave Musić a two-year suspension for testing positive to oxandrolone, an anabolic steroid.

Major results

References

External links
 
 
 
 

1987 births
Living people
Croatian male weightlifters
Weightlifters at the 2016 Summer Olympics
Olympic weightlifters of Croatia
Croatian sportspeople in doping cases
Doping cases in weightlifting
Mediterranean Games gold medalists for Croatia
Mediterranean Games medalists in weightlifting
Competitors at the 2018 Mediterranean Games
Sportspeople from Sarajevo
21st-century Croatian people